Anomaly may refer to:

Science

Natural
Anomaly (natural sciences)
Atmospheric anomaly
Geophysical anomaly

Medical
Congenital anomaly (birth defect), a disorder present at birth
Physical anomaly, a deformation of an anatomical structure
Congenital vertebral anomaly, any of several malformations of the spine
Collie eye anomaly, eye disease of dogs
Coronary artery anomaly, a congenital abnormality in the heart
Ebstein's anomaly, a congenital heart defect
Uhl anomaly, a congenital heart disease affecting the myocardial muscle
Vaginal anomalies

Biology

Anomalous, a species of moth in the Noctuid family
Chromosome anomaly, a disorder caused by a structural error in a chromosome or an atypical number of chromosomes
Genetic anomaly, a disorder caused by mutation
Teratology, the study of developmental anomalies

Physics
Anomalous diffusion, the movement of molecules from a region of lower concentration to a region of higher concentration
Anomalous dispersion (optics), when the speed of an electromagnetic wave increases with increasing frequency
Anomalon, a hypothetical type of nuclear matter that shows an anomalously large reactive cross section
Anomaly (physics), a failure of a symmetry of a theory's classical action
Conformal anomaly, a quantum phenomenon that breaks the conformal symmetry of the classical theory
Chiral anomaly, an anomalous nonconservation of a chiral current
Gauge anomaly, the effect of quantum mechanics that invalidates the gauge symmetry of a quantum field theory
Global anomaly, in quantum physics
Gravitational anomaly, an effect in quantum mechanics that invalidates the general covariance of some theories of general relativity
Konishi anomaly, the violation of the conservation of the Noether current associated with certain transformations
Mixed anomaly, an effect in quantum mechanics
Parity anomaly, associated with parity

Astronomy
In astronomy, an anomaly of an elliptical orbit, generally measured with respect to an apsis, usually the periapsis
Anomalous precession, another term for "apsidal precession"
Eccentric anomaly, an intermediate value used to compute the position of a celestial object as a function of time
Flyby anomaly, an unexpected energy increase during the flybys of the Earth by various satellites
Mean anomaly, a measure of time in the study of orbital dynamics
Pioneer anomaly, the observed deviation of the trajectories of some unmanned space probes, and especially Pioneer 10 and Pioneer 11
South Atlantic Anomaly, an area where the Earth's inner Van Allen radiation belt comes closest to the Earth's surface
True anomaly, the angle between the direction of periapsis and the current position of an object on its orbit

Arts and media

Fictional entities
Anomaly, a rift in the space-time continuum in the television series Futurama
Anomaly, any shortcut to hyperspace travel in Robert Heinlein's novels of the 1950s, today called wormholes
"Anomaly" (Star Trek: Enterprise), a 2003 episode of Star Trek: Enterprise
The Anomaly, a 2014 film
Anomaly (comics), a villain in DC Comics
Anomaly (Primeval), a time portal in the TV series Primeval
Spatial anomaly, an extraordinary disruption in the space-time continuum in the Star Trek universe
The Fortean anomaly, in the work of Charles Fort
The Tycho Magnetic Anomaly (TMA) on the Moon in the novel and in the film 2001: A Space Odyssey by Sir Arthur C. Clarke and Stanley Kubrick
Entities in the SCP universe, often referred to as "anomalies"

Video games
Anomaly: Warzone Earth, a real time strategy video game
Anomaly Korea
Anomaly 2

Publications
The Anomalies, a 2003 novel by Joey Goebel
Anomaly (series), a 2013 trilogy by Krista McGee
Anomaly (graphic novel), by Brian Haberlin
The Anomaly (novel), by French author Hervé Le Tellier

Music

Albums
Anomaly (Ace Frehley album) (2009)
Anomalies (album) (2005), by Cephalic Carnage
Anomaly (The Hiatus album) (2010)
Anomaly (Lecrae album) (2014)
Anomalies, Vol. 1 (2010), by Cave In

Songs
"Anna Molly" (a word play on the word "anomaly"), by Incubus
"Anomaly", a 2004 song by Psyopus from the album Ideas of Reference
"An Anomaly", a 2007 song by It Prevails from the album The Inspiration
"The Anomaly", a 2011 song by Scar Symmetry from the album The Unseen Empire
"Anomaly", a 2012 song by KB from the album Weight & Glory

Technology
Anomaly detection, the process of detecting anomalies from the other, relevant data
Anomaly in software, any condition that deviates from expectation

Business
Market anomaly, a distortion in prices in a financial market
Anomaly (advertising agency), a marketing communications agency based in New York

Other uses
Anomalistics, the study of scientific anomalies
Insult, "Blake you are such an anomaly"
Ararat anomaly, an object on Mount Ararat in Turkey claimed to be the remains of Noah's Ark
Irregular (disambiguation)
Outlier